Abraham (Abie) Wachner  (15 August 1892 – 23 August 1950) was the 35th Mayor of Invercargill from 1942 to 1950. He was awarded the OBE in 1946.

Early life
He was born in London; his father was a furniture manufacturer of Polish-Jewish ancestry. His family moved to Australia when he was three months old and to New Zealand when he was 15. He was in the NZEF in Egypt and Gallipoli; a bugler in the field ambulance in Egypt, then he was a stretcher-bearer at Gallipoli and was invalided home after an injury at Walker's Ridge.
He worked at a Greymouth drapers, then moved to Invercargill about 1919, where he worked in a footwear shop then started his own footwear shop. He was known to give shoes to those in need, and to fire them down stairs to those he did not like; he had fits of temper partly attributable to his war injury.  He served in the Military Reserve and Home Guard in World War II.

Political career 
He was elected to the Invercargill City Council in 1938, becoming deputy mayor in 1941 and mayor in June 1942 after the previous mayor resigned through illness. He was a colourful and enthusiastic mayor, promoting Invercargill as the Auckland of the South, developing Oreti for recreation and securing the first air service to the city.

Personal life and death 
He married Mabel Rice (who he had met while in Greymouth) in 1922. They had two children. He died in Dunedin aged 58 after a short illness while waiting for an operation. He is buried in the Eastern Cemetery, Invercargill.

References

 Abraham Wachner No 3/181 WWI NZEF Military Personnel Record (online)

1892 births
1950 deaths
20th-century New Zealand politicians
Burials at Eastern Cemetery, Invercargill
Deputy mayors of Invercargill
British emigrants to New Zealand
Invercargill City Councillors
Mayors of Invercargill
New Zealand people of Polish-Jewish descent
20th-century New Zealand businesspeople
New Zealand military personnel of World War II
New Zealand military personnel of World War I
New Zealand businesspeople in retailing
New Zealand Officers of the Order of the British Empire